Glyphoturris lampra is an extinct species of sea snail, a marine gastropod mollusc in the family Mangeliidae.

Distribution
Fossils of this species have been found in Pliocene strata of the Bowden Formation, Jamaica.

References

 W. P. Woodring. 1928. Miocene Molluscs from Bowden, Jamaica. Part 2: Gastropods and discussion of results . Contributions to the Geology and Palaeontology of the West Indies

lampra
Gastropods described in 1928